Dhaka Kotwali is the Sadar (Principal) Thana of Dhaka District in the Division of Dhaka, Bangladesh.

Geography
It has 31992 units of household and total area 0.67 km2.

Demographics
At the 1991 Bangladesh census, Dhaka Kotwali had a population of 210,504, of whom 133,564 were aged 18 or older. Males constituted 63.21% of the population, and females 36.79%. Dhaka Kotwali had an average literacy rate of 62.4% (7+ years), against the national average of 32.4%.

See also
 Upazilas of Bangladesh
 Districts of Bangladesh
 Divisions of Bangladesh

References

Old Dhaka
Thanas of Dhaka